Karol Bahrke (March 16, 1868 – 1935) was a Polish Printer and Publisher.

He was born to Masurian parents.

Early publishing career
In 1896 he bought a printing house, co-founded by Mazurska Partia Ludowa. His print shop's main press release was  "Gazeta Ludowa" ("People's Gazette") with a circulation of 2,000 copies, where he was the editor. As newspapers had political implications, Bahrke was threatened with the punishment of imprisonment and in 1898 he left and immigrated permanently to the United States.

References

Polish printers
1868 births
1935 deaths
Polish publishers (people)
Polish expatriates in the United States